Soamibagh is a town and a nagar panchayat in Agra district in the Indian state of Uttar Pradesh.

Demographics
 India census, Swamibagh had a population of 1,909. Males constitute 52% of the population and females 48%. Swamibagh has an average literacy rate of 80%, higher than the national average of 59.5%: male literacy is 82%, and female literacy is 77%. In Swamibagh, 9% of the population is under 6 years of age.

References

Cities and towns in Agra district